Acacia semiaurea is a shrub of the genus Acacia and the subgenus Phyllodineae.

Like most species of Acacia it has phyllodes rather than true leaves.

See also
List of Acacia species

References

semiaurea
Plants described in 1928
Taxa named by Joseph Maiden
Taxa named by William Blakely